Annen is a village in the Dutch province of Drenthe. Located in the municipality of Aa en Hunze, it lies about 12 km (7.4 mi) northeast of Assen.

History
The village was first mentioned in 1309 as Anne. The etymology is unknown. Annen is an esdorp without a church which developed in the Early Middle Ages on the Hondsrug. It was a large triangular brink (village square) in the south-western corner of the village.

The town hall of the municipality of Anloo used to be located in Annen. It is a wide neoclassic building from 1895 which also contained the residential home of the mayor.

Annen was home to 419 people in 1840. The Reformed Church was built in 1954. It was decommissioned in 1980, and now serves as village house and is used by the local veterinarian. It was an independent municipality until 1998 when it was merged into Aa en Hunze.

Transportation
The nearest railway station is Assen station. The following bus services stop in Annen: 58, 59, 93 and 318.

Gallery

References

Populated places in Drenthe
Aa en Hunze